Aaron Elijah ben Aryeh Löb Pumpianski (1835 – 26 April 1893) was a Russian crown rabbi and author.

Born in Vilna in 1835, he graduated from that city's rabbinical school in 1859 and edited, in conjunction with Asher Wohl, the Russian supplement to Ha-Karmel (1860–61). In 1861 Pumpianski was chosen crown rabbi of Ponevezh, Kovno Governorate, where he remained until 1873; he was then elected to the same office in the Jewish community of Riga, remaining there until his death.

Pumpianski was the author of a collection of sermons in Russian which he delivered in Ponevezh (Riga, 1870); a new edition of the Psalms with a Russian translation and a Hebrew commentary (Warsaw, 1871); Solomon Premudroi (Riga, 1882), a Russian drama which he published under the pseudonym "I. Heiman"; Shire-Tsiyyon, Hebrew poetry, of which the latter part contains translations from Russian poets. He also edited a monthly magazine, of which twelve issues appeared in Riga in 1881. He wrote for that magazine and for various other Russian Jewish and Russian periodicals numerous articles on diverse topics, among them being a sketch of the history of the Jews in Courland and Livonia.

Publications

References
 

1835 births
1893 deaths
19th-century dramatists and playwrights from the Russian Empire
Dramatists and playwrights from the Russian Empire
Editors from the Russian Empire
Hebrew-language poets
Jewish writers from the Russian Empire
People from Panevėžys
Rabbis from the Russian Empire
Russian male dramatists and playwrights
Translators of the Bible into Russian
Writers from Riga